Max Eberle (born November 27, 1972 in Las Vegas, Nevada) is an American professional pool player. Eberle reached the semi-finals of the Dragon 14.1 Tournament, in 2006. Eberle won the 2013 Derby City Classic 14.1 Challenge, He won the BCA National Junior Championship in 1991.

Eberle has written the book: zoom Zen Pool: Awaken the Master Within in 2007.

Titles & Achievements
 2020 Jay Swanson Memorial 9-Ball 
 2019 ABN Dream Challenge Team USA vs. Russia 
 2013 Derby City Classic 14.1 Challenge
 2008 Battle of Los Angeles 
 2005 Pechauer West Coast Tour 
 2004 Labor Day Tournament 
 2003 Total Offense Pool Event 
 1994 ACUI Collegiate National Championship 
 1993 ACUI Collegiate National Championship
 1991 BCA National Junior Championship

References

External links

 

American pool players
Living people
Sportspeople from Las Vegas
1972 births